Roye may refer to:

Places

France 
 Roye, Haute-Saône, in the Haute-Saône department
 Roye, Somme, in the Somme department
 Canton of Roye, a canton in the department of the Somme
 Roye-sur-Matz, in the Oise department

People

As a Surname
 Al Roye (born 1940), Jamaican boxer, see Jack Bodell
 Anthony Roye (1922–1995), Welsh TV actor, featured in Fall of Eagles, Brain Versus Brawn and The Avengers
  (1170-1237), Grand Chamberman of France and belligerent in the Battle of Bouvines
 , painter, brother of Paladine Roye
 Bronwyn Roye (born 1970), Australian rower
 Charles Roye, American boxer, see Reggie Gross
 Charles de Roye, Count of Roucy (1510-1551), French nobleman, father of Eléanor de Roucy de Roye
 Edward James Roye (1815–1872), fifth President of Liberia
 Gilles de Roye (died 1478), Flemish chronicler and Cistercian monk
 Guy of Roye (died 1409), French prelate
 Horace Roye (1906–2002), photographer
 Jimmy Roye (born 1988), French professional footballer
 Norman Roye (1935–1956), American serial killer 
 Orpheus Roye (born 1973), American football player
 Paladine Roye (1946–2001), Native American painter
 Peter van Roye (born 1950), German rower
 Tim Roye, radio play-by-play announcer for the NBA's Golden State Warriors

Other
 House of Roye, French noble family which held the county of Roucy
 Roye Albrighton, English musician, member of rock band Nektar
 Roye England, founder of Pendon Museum, England